John Robert Leake (born August 28, 1981) is a former American football linebacker.

Early life and college
Leake was born in Plano, Texas and graduated from Plano East Senior High School in 2000. At Clemson University, Leake played at linebacker for the Clemson Tigers football team from 2000 to 2003.

NFL career

Leake was not selected in the 2004 NFL Draft. On April 26, 2004, Leake signed as an undrafted free agent with the Tennessee Titans. The Titans waived Leake on September 4.

Leake split the 2005 NFL season between the Atlanta Falcons and the Green Bay Packers. The following season, he was once again a member of the Falcons.

References

1981 births
Living people
Plano East Senior High School alumni
American football linebackers
Atlanta Falcons players
Clemson Tigers football players
Green Bay Packers players
Players of American football from Texas
Sportspeople from Plano, Texas